The 2010 Mozambican protests were a series of food riots and deadly mass demonstrations sparked by spiralling food inflation and unemployment. Bread riots erupted on 1 September after a week of small strikes and turned into a street uprising, turning against the government, poverty, unemployment, inflation and hunger. Tens of thousands of opposition supporters were told to March and rally for their freedom and break the fear barrier. After 4 were killed in riots in Maputo, hundreds then thousands turned up in protest movements nationwide. 13 were killed in the next few days of general strikes and Riots. The wave of unprecedented violence was the biggest since the end of the Mozambican Civil War.

References

2010 protests
2010 in Mozambique